The William J. Gregory House is a historic house located at 8140 Lowell Boulevard in Westminster, Colorado.  It was listed on the National Register of Historic Places in 1996.

It is a two-and-a-half-story Dutch Colonial Revival-style brick house.

It was built in 1910 as one of the earliest homes in the original townsite of Westminster.

See also
National Register of Historic Places listings in Adams County, Colorado

References

External links

 History of Colorado

Houses in Adams County, Colorado
Dutch Colonial Revival architecture
Historic districts on the National Register of Historic Places in Colorado
Houses on the National Register of Historic Places in Colorado
National Register of Historic Places in Adams County, Colorado
Houses completed in 1910